Pacheh-ye Anjir (also Romanized as Pācheh-ye Ānjīr) is a village in Boli Rural District, Chavar District, Ilam County, Ilam Province, Iran. At the 2006 census, its population was 25, in 5 families. The village is populated by Kurds.

References 

Populated places in Ilam County
Kurdish settlements in Ilam Province